Over 50 villages and tribes of the Ohlone (also known as Costanoan) Native American people have been identified as existing in Northern California circa 1769 in the regions of the San Francisco Peninsula, Santa Clara Valley, East Bay, Santa Cruz Mountains, Monterey Bay and Salinas Valley. The known tribe names and village locations of people who spoke the Costanoan languages are listed by regions below.

San Francisco Peninsula

Languages spoken: Ramaytush, Tamyen on southern border

Tribes and villages of the San Francisco Peninsula:
 Ahwaste – the San Francisco Peninsula 
 Chiguan – Pacific Coast of San Francisco Peninsula vicinity of Half Moon Bay 
 Cotegen – Pacific Coast south of Half Moon Bay
 Lamchin – present-day San Mateo County, Bay shore from Belmont south to Redwood City and valleys to the west
 Oljon – Pacific Coast on lower San Gregorio Creek and Pescadero Creek
 Quiroste – Pacific Coast from Bean Hollow Creek to Ano Nuevo Creek
 name unknown – At Tunitas Creek 
 Romonan – the San Francisco Peninsula
 Ssalson (tribe) – along San Mateo Creek, in San Andreas Valley. Had 3 villages:
 Aleitac (village) –  along San Mateo Creek in San Andreas Valley
 Altahmo (village; also spelled Altagmu) – along San Mateo Creek in San Andreas Valley
 Uturbe (village) – along San Mateo Creek in San Andreas Valley
 Pruristac – One mile from the Pacific Coast in San Pedro Valley, near San Pedro Creek, present day Pacifica
 Timigtac – half mile from Pacific Coast, on bank of Calera Creek, present-day Pacifica
 Tulomo –  the San Francisco Peninsula 
 Urebure (also spelled Buriburi) – San Bruno Creek south of San Bruno Mountain
 Yelamu (tribe) – northern San Francisco Peninsula
 Amuctac (village) – near Visitacion Valley in San Francisco
 Abmoctac (village) connected with Dolores Mission
 Acnagis (village) connected with Dolores Mission 
 Acynm (village) connected with Dolores Mission 
 Aleta  (village) connected with Dolores Mission 
 Aluenchi (village) connected with Dolores Mission 
 Amutaja (village) connected with Dolores Mission 
 Anamas (village) connected with Dolores Mission 
 Anamon  (village) connected with Dolores Mission 
 Anchin  (village) connected with Dolores Mission 
 Aramay  (village) connected with Dolores Mission 
 Assunta  (village) connected with Dolores Mission 
 Atarpe  (village) connected with Dolores Mission 
 Cachanegtac  (village) connected with Dolores Mission 
 Caprnp  (village) connected with Dolores Mission 
 Carascan  (village) connected with Dolores Mission 
 Cazopo  (village) connected with Dolores Mission 
 Chagunte  (village) connected with Dolores Mission 
 Chanigtac  (village) connected with Dolores Mission 
 Chapngtac  (village) connected with Dolores Mission 
 Chayen  (village) connected with Dolores Mission 
 Chicntae  (village) connected with Dolores Mission 
 Chiguau  (village) connected with Dolores Mission 
 Chipisclin  (village) connected with Dolores Mission 
 Chipletac  (village) connected with Dolores Mission 
 Chiputca  (village) connected with Dolores Mission   
 Chuchictac  (village) connected with Dolores Mission 
 Churmutce  (village) connected with Dolores Mission 
 Chuscan  (village) connected with Dolores Mission 
 Chutchin  (village) connected with Dolores Mission 
 Chynau  (village) connected with Dolores Mission 
 Conop  (village) connected with Dolores Mission 
 Elarroyde  (village) connected with Dolores Mission  
 Flunmuda   (village) connected with Dolores Mission 
 Gamchines  (village) connected with Dolores Mission 
 Genau   (village) connected with Dolores Mission 
 Guanlen  (village) connected with Dolores Mission 
 Guloismistae  (village) connected with Dolores Mission 
 Halchis  (village) connected with Dolores Mission 
 Horocroc  (village) connected with Dolores Mission 
 Huimen  (village) connected with Dolores Mission 
 Hunctu  (village) connected with Dolores Mission 
 Itaes  (village) connected with Dolores Mission 
 Joquizara  (village) connected with Dolores Mission 
 Josquigard  (village) connected with Dolores Mission 
 Juniamuc  (village) connected with Dolores Mission 
 Juris  (village) connected with Dolores Mission 
 Lamsim  (village) connected with Dolores Mission 
 Libantone  (village) connected with Dolores Mission 
 Livangebra  (village) connected with Dolores Mission 
 Livangelva  (village) connected with Dolores Mission 
 Luianeglua  (village) connected with Dolores Mission 
 Luidneg  (village) connected with Dolores Mission 
 Macsinum  (village) connected with Dolores Mission 
 Malvaitac  (village) connected with Dolores Mission 
 Mitline  (village) connected with Dolores Mission 
 Muingpe  (village) connected with Dolores Mission 
 Naig (village) connected with Dolores mission 
 Olemos. A former rancheria connected with Dolores 
 Olestura rancheria connected with Dolores mission 
 Olpen rancheria connected with Dolores mission 
 Ompivromo (village) connected with Dolores mission 
 Olmolosoc rancheria connected with Dolores mission
 Otoacte (village) connected with Dolores Mission 
 Ousint (village) connected with Dolores mission 
 Patnetac (village) connected with Dolores mission 
 Pructaca (village)connected with Dolores mission 
 Proqueu (village) connected with Dolores mission 
 Purutea (village)connected with Dolores mission 
 Puycone (village) connected with Dolores mission 
 Sadaues rancheria connected with Dolores mission 
 Sagunte (village) connected with Dolores mission 
 Saraise (village) connected with Dolores mission 
 Sarontac (village) connected with Dolores mission 
 Satumuo rancheria connected with Dolores mission 
 Saucon  (village) connected with Dolores mission 
 Sicca (village) connected with Dolores mission 
 Sipanum (village) connected with Dolores mission 
 Siscastac (village) connected to Dolores Mission 
 Sitintajea rancheria connected with Dolores mission 
 Sitlintaj rancheria connected with Dolores mission 
 Ssalayme (village) connected with Dolores Mission 
 Ssichitca (village) connected with Dolores Mission 
 Ssiti (village) connected with Dolores Mission 
 Ssogereate (village) connected with Dolores Mission 
 Saupichum (village) connected with Dolores Mission 
 Subchiam (village) connected with Dolores mission 
 Suchigin (village) connected with Dolores mission 
 Suchui (village) connected with Dolores mission 
 Sunchaque (village) connected with Dolores mission 
 Tatquinte (village) connected with Dolores mission 
 Timsim (village) connected with Dolores mission 
 Titiyu (village) connected with Dolores mission 
 Torose (village) connected with Dolores mission 
 Totola (village) connected with Dolores mission 
 Tubisuste (village) connected with Dolores mission 
 Tuca (village) connected with Dolores mission 
 Tupuic (village) connected with Dolores mission 
 Tupuinte (village) connected with Dolores mission 
 Tuzsint (village) connected with Dolores mission 
 Ussete (village) connected with Dolores mission 
 Vagerpe (village) connected with Dolores mission 
 Yacomui (village) connected with Dolores mission 
 Zomiomi (village) connected with Dolores mission 
 Zucigin (village) connected with Dolores mission 
 Chutchui (village) – near the present day site of Mission Dolores in San Francisco.
 Uchium – a division of the Olamentke, and according to Chamisso one of the most numerous connected with Dolores mission in 1816
 Petlenuc (village) – near the Presidio of San Francisco
 Sitlintac (village) – near Mission Creek in San Francisco
 Tubsinta (village) – near Visitacion Valley in San Francisco
 Puichon – near present-day Menlo Park, Palo Alto and Mountain View
 Tuchayune – fishing village on Yerba Buena Island 

The following tribes furnished most of the converts at Mission Dolores:
Ahwaste, Bolbone, Chiguau, Cuchillones, Chuscan, Cotejen, Junatca, Karkin,
Khulpuni, Olemos, Olhon, Olmolococ, Olpen, Quemelentus, Quirogles, Saclan,
Salzon (Suisun), Sanchines, Saucou, Sichican, Uchium & Uquitinac.

Santa Clara Valley
Languages spoken: Tamyen, Chochenyo on eastern fringes

Tamyen language region (also spelled Tamien, Thamien) – tentatively Santa Clara Valley along Guadalupe River and west through Cupertino.

Tribes and villages of Santa Clara Valley:
 Alson – low marshlands at southern end of San Francisco Bay, present-Day Newark, Milpitas and Alviso
 Asirin – Coast Ranges east of Santa Clara Valley
 Aulintac (also spelled Auxentac) – along Coyote Creek
 Churistac – cover term for cluster of villages in the mountains east of Morgan Hill
 Matalan – Santa Clara Valley from Coyote to Morgan Hill
 Pala (also known as Palenos) – mountains of Hall's Valley between Santa Clara Valley and Mount Hamilton
 Ritocsi – Santa Clara Valley at Upper Guadalupe River and central Coyote Creek
 San Bernardino Group – Santa Clara Valley unknown location; see Partacsi
 Lamaytu (tribe) – Santa Clara Valley
 Muyson (tribe) – Santa Clara Valley
 Pornen (tribe) – Santa Clara Valley
 Solchequis (tribe) – Santa Clara Valley
 So-co-is-u-ka (village) – the original site of the Mission Santa Clara (Mission Santa Clara de Thamien) on the Guadalupe River, 1777
 "Santa Ysabel" – eastern Santa Clara Valley and Upper Calaveras Creek
 Somontac (also called Santa Clara) – tentatively Los Gatos region of Santa Clara Valley, and/or a village of the Matalan
 Thamien (village or locality) – the original site of the Mission Santa Clara (Mission Santa Clara de Thamien) on the Guadalupe River, 1777
 Tayssen – large area of eastern Coast Ranges east and southeast of Santa Clara Valley

In vicinity:
 Junas – probably in Hospital Creek drainage or San Antonio Valley of Diablo Range
 Werwersen – vicinity of Mount Hamilton, Diablo Range 

*See also: Chitactac, Partacsi, possibly in this valley.

East Bay area
Languages spoken: Chochenyo, Karkin in the north

Tribes and villages of the East Bay area:
 Causen (aka Patlans) – Sunol Valley
 Huchiun – large area of East Bay shore, from Temescal Creek to present-day Richmond
 Huchiun-Aguasto – East Bay on southeast shores of San Pablo Bay
 Karkin (aka Los Carquines in Spanish) – on both sides of Carquinez Strait, present-day Crockett, Port Costa, Martinez and Benicia
 Luecha – southeast of Livermore
 Jalquin/Yrgen – present day Hayward, Castro Valley
 Pelnen – western part of Livermore Valley, from Pleasanton to Dublin
 Seunen – northwest side of Livermore Valley
 Souyen – marshland of Livermore Valley and up Tassajara Creek into southern foothills of Mount Diablo
 Ssaoam – around Brushy Peak and Altamont Pass, between Livermore Valley and San Joaquin Valley
 Yulian (either a subgroup or alias name of Ssaoams)
 Taunan – mountainous parts of Alameda Creek and Arroyo del Valle south to Alameda–Contra Costa County line
 Tuibun – mouth of Alameda Creek and Coyote Hills area, eastern shore of San Francisco Bay.  Site is preserved in Coyote Hills Regional Park.
 Saclan – a former group or division of the Costanoan family inhabiting the shore at or south of Oakland

Santa Cruz Mountains
Languages spoken: Awaswas, Tamyen on eastern border

Tribes and villages of the Santa Cruz Mountains:
 Achista (tentatively included Acsaggis) – Santa Cruz Mountains, present-day Boulder Creek, and Riverside Grove
 Chalumu – current location of city of Santa Cruz
 Chaloctac – around Loma Prieta Creek on crest of Santa Cruz Mountains
 Chitactac – Santa Cruz Mountains and/or Santa Clara Valley
 Cotoni – Pacific Coast at present-day Davenport 
 Olpen (also known as Guemelentos) – interior hills and valleys in Santa Cruz Mountains, La Honda Creek, Corte de Madera Creek
 Partacsi (also known as "Paltrastach") – Saratoga Gap mountainous area, upper Pescadero Creek, Stevens Creek, and Saratoga Creek watersheds; tentatively the village and center of San Bernardino tribal groups
 Sayanta – Scotts Valley, Glenwood, and Laurel areas (part of Mexican grant Arrollo de Sayante)
 Sokel – present-day Aptos

Monterey Bay area
Languages spoken: Awaswas north coast, Rumsen south coast, Mutsun inland

Tribes and villages of the Monterey Bay area:
 Aptos – Shores of Monterey Bay from Aptos east, halfway up Pajaro River
 Cajastaca – north or northeast of Watsonville, near the Pajaro River
 Ichxenta – at San Jose Creek, near Point Lobos State Reserve 
 Kalindaruk (Calendaruc)- Monterey County 
 Rumsien (village) – Carmel River, roughly 5 miles inland from San Carlos Mission and Pacific Coast 
 Uypi – present-day City of Santa Cruz
 Wacharon – near present-day Moss Landing

Salinas Valley
Languages spoken: Rumsen, Mutsun, Chalon

Tribes and villages of Salinas Valley:
 Ansaime (also spelled Ausaima) – east side of San Felipe sink on Pacheco Creek
 Chipuctac – Cañada de los Osos area northeast of Gilroy
 Mutsun (village) – at the Mission San Juan Bautista, on San Benito River, west of present-day city of Hollister.
 Pitac – possibly San Martin area or else part of Unijama in the Gilroy area 
 Tomoi – in the general area of Pacheco Pass
 Unijaima (also spelled Unijaimas) – Gilroy and Carnadero areas
 Wachero-n – at site of Mission Soledad on Salinas River

Notes

References 

 Kroeber, Alfred L. 1925. Handbook of the Indians of California. Washington, D.C: Bureau of American Ethnology Bulletin No. 78. (map of villages, page 465)
 Milliken, Randall. A Time of Little Choice: The Disintegration of Tribal Culture in the San Francisco Bay Area 1769-1810 Menlo Park, CA: Ballena Press Publication, 1995.  (alk. paper)

Further reading 
 Beeler, Madison S. Northern Costanoan, International Journal of American Linguistics, 1961. 27: 191-197.
 Brown, Alan K. Indians of San Mateo County, La Peninsula:Journal of the San Mateo County Historical Association, Vol. XVII No. 4, Winter 1973-1974.
 Brown, Alan K. Place Names of San Mateo County, published San Mateo County Historical Association, 1975.
 Teixeira, Lauren. The Costanoan/Ohlone Indians of the San Francisco and Monterey Bay Area, A Research Guide. Menlo Park, CA: Ballena Press Publication, 1997. .
 Handbook of American Indians North of Mexico Part 2 – Edited by Frederick Webb Hodge 1910

 Villages
Ohlone Villages
Ohlone Villages
Ohlone Villages
Ohlone Villages
Ohlone Villages
Ohlone Villages
Ohlone Villages
Ohlone Villages
Ohlone Villages
Ohlone Villages
Ohlone Villages
Ohlone
Native American-related lists